An ecclesiastical judge (or ) is an ecclesiastical person who possesses ecclesiastical jurisdiction either in general or in the strict sense. Up until 1858 when Ecclesiastical courts were abolished, ecclesiastical judges tried church clergy men in church courts or Ecclesiastical courts. Charges dealt in these courts were often very lenient, especially when dealt to church clergymen.

Catholic canon law

The official body appointed by the qualified ecclesiastical authority for the administration of justice is called a court Every such court consists at the least of two sworn officials: the judge who gives the decision, and the clerk of the court, whose duty is to keep a record of the proceedings and the decision. As a rule, however, an ecclesiastical court forms a collegiate tribunal, the members of which either join with the presiding officer in giving the decision as judges or merely advise with him as councillors (cc. xvi, xxi, xxii, xxiii, X, De off. et pot. jud. deleg., I, xxix).
 
Connected with the courts are advocates, procurators, syndics, defenders, promoters, conservators, apparitors, messengers etc. The procurators and advocates conduct the case as the representatives or defenders of the parties to the suit; the syndic is the counsel of a juridical person, a collegiate body or a chapter. The fiscal promoter is appointed by the ecclesiastical authorities to watch over ecclesiastical discipline, consequently in penal cases he appears as public prosecutor. A , or defender of the matrimonial tie, assists in suits concerning the invalidity of a marriage.

In addition to his jurisdiction, which can be ordinary, quasi-ordinary or delegated, the ecclesiastical judge must also have certain physical and moral qualities. It is further necessary to have full use of his senses and understanding, and suitable legal knowledge; the person appointed must also be twenty years old; but eighteen years will suffice for a judge appointed by the pope or if the parties agree to it. The judge must also have a good reputation, must not be excommunicated, suspended from office, or under an interdict Above all he must be impartial; a suspicion of partiality attaches to the judge who is personally interested in a case, or is related by blood within the fourth degree to one of the parties, or connected with one by marriage, or who lives in the same house, or dines at a common table, or is otherwise friendly, or on the other hand inimical, towards one of the parties, and he may be rejected by the accused or by both parties as prejudiced If objection be raised against a judge on the ground of prejudice, which must be done in writing and if possible before the beginning of the action, arbitrators are to pass on the objection; if, however, objection be raised against the delegate of the bishop, the decision rests with the bishop. If the objection be declared well-founded, the judge transfers the case, with the concurrence of the party who brought the accusation, to another or to a higher judge. If the judge lacks the necessary qualifications, and this be known to the parties in the suit, the decision is invalid; if, however, his unfitness be unknown to the parties, and he follow statute canon law, the Church supplements the deficiency, even if the judge have acted in bad faith. 

Ecclesiastical jurisdiction is exercised over all baptized persons; yet in order that an ecclesiastical judge may be permitted to exercise  his judicial power he must also be competent, i.e. must be authorized to pass judgment on a given person in a given case Proceedings held before a judge without competence are null and void. Those subject to the jurisdiction of a certain judge are said to be within the competence of his court, or have their  in him. The forum is either the free, voluntary choice of the parties, or it is defined by law, but in criminal and matrimonial cases there is no . Ecclesiastics can choose another judge only with the permission of the bishop, and in this case he must be an ecclesiastic The legal forum is either ordinary, if the proper course of the regular courts is followed, or extraordinary, if for legal reasons a regular court is passed over.
 
The axiom holds: , the plaintiff goes to the court of the accused. Domicile is that place where one actually resides with the intention of always remaining there Quasi-domicile is determined by actual residence at the place and the intention to remain there at least the greater part of the year; there is also a domicile by operation of law, legal or fictitious domicile—thus a wife may be subject to the jurisdiction of the domicile of the husband, children to that of the parents, religious to that of the place where the monastery is situated, persons having no fixed abode to that of the present place of residence A process can be instituted at Rome against an ecclesiastic who is only accidentally there. Besides the—usual—, there is also that of the object (where the thing is situated), i.e. complaint can be brought before the judge in whose district the controverted object is; the forum where the contract is made, i.e. the parties can bring action before the judge in whose district the disputed contract has been made; that of the offence, within the jurisdiction where the offence was committed. There is also a forum arising from the connection of matters, if the matters in dispute are so interrelated that one cannot be decided without the other; also the forum of a counterplea, i.e. in a criminal suit the defendant can, on his side, accuse the plaintiff in the court of the judge before whom he himself is to be tried. If the judge himself wishes to bring an accusation, the superior appoints the judge who is to hear it. The decision of an incompetent judge is valid if by common error he is held to be competent In civil disputes the parties can entrust the decision to any desired arbiter. 

If the judge render a defective decision, appeal can be taken to the next higher judge; this relation of the courts to one another and the successive course of appeals, called succession of instances, follows the order of superiority. From the beginning the bishop, or his representative, the archdeacon, or the "official", or the vicar-general, was the judge in first instance for all suits, contentious or criminal, which arose in the diocese or in the corresponding administrative district, so far as such suits were not withdrawn from his jurisdiction by the common law. The court of second instance was originally the provincial synod, later the metropolitan. The court of the third instance was that of the pope. The court of the first instance for bishops was the provincial synod, the metropolitan, the exarch or the patriarch; the court of second instance was that of the pope; only the pope could be the judge of first instance for exarchs and patriarchs. If the see is vacant the vicar-capitular is judge of the court of first instance. The judge of the second instance is the metropolitan. For archdioceses, as a rule, the judge of second instance is a neighbouring archbishop or bishop appointed by the Holy See. The same ordinance also applies to exempt bishoprics.

In the Middle Ages the lower courts were often evaded, or the popes summoned the suits at one before their forum; this custom had some advantages on account of the better legal education and greater impartiality of the members of the papal court, but the administration of justice was delayed and, above all, made more costly by the rule enforced in the papal courts that the parties must appear in person. What made the matter still worse was that such summonses to Rome, as to the court of first instance, diminish unduly the authority of the lower courts. To put an end, therefore, to constant complaint on this point, the Decretals ordained that in future, before the rendering of the sentence, no one could appeal to a higher court without giving a sufficient reason to the judge  (from whom the appeal was made), and that the appeal could only be accepted by the judge  (to whom appeal lies) after he had satisfied himself of the validity of the appeal Lawsuits, therefore, pending before the Apostolic See were to be tried by a judge belonging to the place whence the appeal came, and especially appointed by the pope. In the late Middle Ages rulers of countries were frequently granted for their domains the papal  (exemption from summons); in some cases, they forbade the appeal to a foreign court. 

Following the precedents of the Synod of Constance and Synod of Basle, the Council of Trent decreed: The court of the bishop is the court of first instance Each suit must be brought to a close within at least two years. During this period no appeal is permitted, neither can the higher judge summon the case before his forum; an appeal before the lapse of two years is permissible only if a final sentence has been pronounced.

In case of appeal to the Apostolic See, or if the latter, for good reasons, summons a suit from the beginning before its forum, the suit is to be decided either at Rome or by delegated judges on the spot. As on account of the remoteness of the place where the dispute arose and the consequent lack of knowledge of local persons, unsuitable judges have been at times appointed at the place where the dispute arose, the bishops are each to select, on occasion of the provincial—or diocesan synod, at least four men having the qualities designated by Boniface VIII, and present their names to the Apostolic See, which in its selection of judges is to be so limited to the persons thus named that the delegation of any other person is invalid; as provincial and diocesan synods are no longer regularly held, bishops are permitted to make this selection with the advice of the diocesan chapter; consequently, judges so appointed are called . At present, this also is no longer customary: on the contrary, the Apostolic See appoints its representatives  entirely independently, but it is so arranged that the delegation is bestowed on neighbor bishops and archbishops for a definite term of years. Such delegation is all the more necessary in case a State does not permit ecclesiastical suits to be tried outside of its boundaries, or will only permit the judgement of such a court to be executed within its territories by the secular power.

See also
Officialis

References
Source
 
Notes

Ecclesiastical titles